"The Boys and Me" is a song written by Mark Miller and Mac McAnally, and recorded by American country music group Sawyer Brown.  It was released in October 1993 as the second single from the album Outskirts of Town.  The song reached number 4 on the Billboard Hot Country Singles & Tracks chart.

Outskirts of Town also features a "dance mix" of the song, created by Brian Tankersley.

Chart performance

Year-end charts

References

1993 singles
1993 songs
Sawyer Brown songs
Songs written by Mac McAnally
Songs written by Mark Miller (musician)
Music videos directed by Michael Salomon
Curb Records singles